Benelux' Next Top Model, Season 1 was the first season of Benelux' Next Top Model and the first season which include Dutch and Flemish contestants. It premiered on September 14, 2009, and lasted until November 16 of the same year.

Given the show was a merge between Holland's Next Top Model and the Belgian Topmodel which both follow the same format, the panel of judges, as well as the contestants, were representing both nations for one-half.

The winner of the competition was 22-year-old Rosalinde Kikstra from Rotterdam. Her prizes were a €75,000 contract with Modelmasters The Agency, a cover of Beau Monde and ad campaigns for Max Factor and Gillette Venus Embrace.

Contestants 
(ages stated are at start of contest)

Episodes

Summaries

Call-out order 

  The contestant was put through collectively to the next round 
 The contestant was eliminated
 The contestant was immune from elimination
 The contestant won the competition

Judges 
Daphne Deckers (Host)
Ghislaine Nuytten
Geert De Wolf
Bastiaan van Schaik
Mariana Verkerk

Other cast members 
 Marie-Sophie Steenaert – Make-up Artist
 Jani Kazaltzis – Wardrobe

Special guests 
 Janice Dickinson – Episode 2
 Olcay Gulsen – Episode 2
 Doutzen Kroes – Episode 3
 Victoria Koblenko – Episode 4
 Nigel Barker – Episode 10

References

External links 
Official 2BE website
Official RTL5 website

Top Model